Fardel may refer to:
Shakespearian word meaning "traveller's bundle", as used in The Winter's Tale
Shakespearian word meaning "burden", as used in Hamlet's To be, or not to be speech
Scots word, also spelled "Farl", quadrant-shaped flatbread or cake
the omasum, third compartment of the stomach in ruminants
Fardel Manor, medieval manor and house in South Hams, Devon